This is a list of neighborhoods in Richmond, California, United States.

Atchison Village
Belding Woods
Brickyard Cove
Carriage Hills
Castro Heights
Central Richmond
City Center
Coronado
Cortez/Stege
Crescent Park
Country Club Vista
Downtown (Richmond)
East Richmond
Eastshore
El Sobrante Hills
Fairmede/Hilltop
Greenbriar
Green Ridge Heights
Hasford Heights
Hilltop Bayview
Hilltop District
Hilltop Green
Hilltop Village
Iron Triangle
Laurel Park
Marina Bay
May Valley
North & East
Panhandle Annex
Parchester Village
Park Plaza
Parkview
Point Isabel
Point Richmond
Pullman
Quail Hill
Richmond Annex
Richmond Heights (Mira Vista, Richmond View)
Richmore Village/Metro Square
Santa Fe
Shields-Reid
Southwest Richmond Annex

References

External links
 Map of Richmond neighborhood councils, 8" × 11"
 Map of Richmond neighborhood councils, 34" × 44"